Viento Frío is a corregimiento in Santa Isabel District, Colón Province, Panama with a population of 487 as of 2010. Its population as of 1990 was 396; its population as of 2000 was 427.

References

Corregimientos of Colón Province